Ryan McCauley is an Australian rugby union player of Irish descent, who plays as a lock for the English Premiership team the Exeter Chiefs. He has also represented Australia in the under 20s team and Schoolboys level.

On 13 August 2021 McCauley signed for Exeter Chiefs, on a short term deal, from Western Force. On 16 October 2021, McCauley made his first Premiership start for Exeter Chiefs, against Wasps

References

1997 births
Living people
Australian rugby union players
Rugby union locks
New South Wales Country Eagles players
New South Wales Waratahs players
Sydney (NRC team) players
Western Force players
Exeter Chiefs players
Rugby union players from Sydney